The LB&SCR L Class was a class of 4-6-4 steam tank locomotives designed by L. B. Billinton for the London, Brighton and South Coast Railway.  They were known as the "Brighton Baltics", Baltic being the European name for the 4-6-4 wheel arrangement. Seven examples were built between April 1914 and April 1922 and they were used for express passenger services.

Background
By 1913, the LB&SCR was well supplied with modern passenger locomotives except for the heaviest express trains. L. B. Billinton was undecided whether to enlarge the J1 and J2 4-6-2 tank locomotives designed by his predecessor D. E. Marsh, or design an equivalent sized 4-6-0 tender locomotive. Large tank locomotives were well-suited to the operating conditions of the railway with relatively short distances but very intensive use of the system, particularly in the vicinity of London. Billinton therefore placed an order for one 4-6-4 tank and one 4-6-0 tender locomotive from Brighton railway works in November 1913. However, soon after the delivery of the first tank engine in April 1914 the order for the second was changed to another tank engine. The four trailing bogie wheels were added to enable more fuel to be carried and to give additional stability when running bunker-first.

Modification and further deliveries
Soon after the first two examples were introduced into traffic, the class was found to be unstable at high speed and prone to derailment, due to water surging in the large side tanks. This had the effect of lowering the centre of gravity of the locomotive.
Once modified the first two locomotives proved to be most successful, but further deliveries were delayed by the onset of the First World War. Five more examples were built between October 1921 and April 1922. No. 333 Remembrance was the last new locomotive built by the London, Brighton and South Coast Railway, before it became a part of the Southern Railway on 1 January 1923. It was named in honour of the members of the railway killed in the war.

Post grouping
The original Robinson superheaters were replaced by those of  Richard Maunsell's design during the 1920s and 1930s, and the original LB&SCR numbers were increased by 2000. The seven members of the class were kept fully occupied on the main express services between London and Brighton until the line was electrified in 1933. They were then transferred to Eastbourne to work on London expresses in January 1933, but the planned electrification of that line looked set to make them redundant once again.

N15X Class
For details of the class in their rebuilt form see SR N15X class

As the locomotives were still relatively new and performing well, Maunsell decided to rebuild them for use on express trains on the Western section of Southern Railway. Between December 1934 and February 1936 all seven members of the class were rebuilt as 4-6-0 tender locomotives, and given the new designation ‘’N15X’’. Six of the class were named after famous locomotive engineers but 2333 retained its original name.
The new class were based at Nine Elms and were used on services to Bournemouth and Southampton but in their rebuilt state they did not perform as well as the existing King Arthur class and so tended to be relegated to secondary services.
Between November 1941 and July 1943 the class was loaned to the Great Western Railway for use on freight trains.

British Railways
All seven N15X locomotives entered British Railways stock on 1 January 1948 and continued to be used on secondary services until the mid-1950s. The first withdrawal took place in January 1955, and the last in July 1957. No examples have been preserved.

Locomotive summary

No. 333 was the LB&SCR war memorial locomotive, and bore a plaque reading "In grateful remembrance of the 532 men of the L.B.&S.C.Rly, who gave their lives for their country, 1914–1919".

References

Sources
 

 

4-6-4T locomotives
L class
Railway locomotives introduced in 1914
Scrapped locomotives
Standard gauge steam locomotives of Great Britain
2′C2′ h2t locomotives